Summerdean is an unincorporated community in Augusta County, Virginia, United States. The Glebe Schoolhouse, which is listed on the National Register of Historic Places, is located near Summerdean.

References

Unincorporated communities in Augusta County, Virginia
Unincorporated communities in Virginia